Tereshchuk is a Ukrainian surname. Notable people with the surname include:

 Borys Tereshchuk (born 1945) Ukrainian volleyball player
 Tetyana Tereshchuk-Antipova (born 1969) Ukrainian hurdler
 Orest Tereshchuk (born 1981) Ukrainian tennis player
 Victoria Tereshchuk (born 1982) Ukrainian pentathlete

See also
 

Ukrainian-language surnames